Blanche Edith Thompson (18 March 1874 – 19 January 1963) was a notable New Zealand piano teacher, sportswoman and social reformer. She was born in Brown's Bridge, North Canterbury, New Zealand in 1874. She participated in cycling, then swimming, and later croquet. In 1905, she may have been the first New Zealand woman to have won a driving competition.

References

1874 births
1963 deaths
New Zealand music teachers
New Zealand activists
New Zealand women activists
New Zealand sportswomen
People from Amberley, New Zealand
Women music educators